Mugarm (also Romanized as Mūgarm) is a village in Alqchin Rural District, in the Central District of Charam County, Kohgiluyeh and Boyer-Ahmad Province, Iran. At the 2006 census, its population was 139, in 26 families.

References 

Populated places in Charam County